Arthur Eason was the first head football coach for the William Paterson University Pioneers football team in Wayne Township, New Jersey. He served for just one year, in 1972, and compiled a 3–7 overall record (1–4 conference).

Eason, despite only serving as coach for one season, remained at WPU as its athletic director. He held this position from 1972 to 2002, and in 2003 was elected to the William Paterson University Hall of Fame. Eason had also received his M.A. from WPU in 1971.

Head coaching record

References

External links
 William Paterson Hall of Fame profile

Year of birth missing (living people)
Living people
William Paterson Pioneers football coaches
William Paterson University alumni